Kevin Dawson (born 18 June 1981) is an English professional footballer who plays for Stocksbridge Park Steels, as a defender.

Early and personal life
Born in Northallerton, Dawson is the middle brother of fellow footballers Andy and Michael.

Career
Dawson began his career with Nottingham Forest, making 11 appearances in the Football League between 1999 and 2002. While at Forest, Dawson spent a brief loan spell at Barnet, making five league appearances. After leaving Forest, Dawson spent three seasons with Chesterfield, making 51 league appearances and scoring once against Huddersfield Town. Dawson later played non-league football with Barrow, Worksop Town, Wakefield and Stocksbridge Park Steels.

References

1981 births
Living people
English footballers
People from Northallerton
Nottingham Forest F.C. players
Barnet F.C. players
Chesterfield F.C. players
Barrow A.F.C. players
Worksop Town F.C. players
Wakefield F.C. players
Stocksbridge Park Steels F.C. players
English Football League players
Footballers from North Yorkshire
Footballers from Yorkshire
Association football defenders